Jennifer Exaltacion (born 6 August 1979) is a Canadian gymnast. She competed in five events at the 1996 Summer Olympics.

References

External links
 

1979 births
Living people
Canadian female artistic gymnasts
Olympic gymnasts of Canada
Gymnasts at the 1996 Summer Olympics
Sportspeople from Windsor, Ontario